Chohtan  is a village and tehsil headquarters in Barmer district of Rajasthan state. There are several temples in the area, including Viratra(Vankal), Deri Dungar, Sunya Temple, Kapaleshwar, Krishna Temple, Verthan.

Geography
Chohtan is surrounded by hills in the west & north and by desert in the east and south. The village is located approximately 50  km from district headquarters Barmer. They are connected via road. Its location near the border with Pakistan makes it a place of strategic importance. Festivals and other events are celebrated by people. People  here are very religious. There are temples, some of them are Jain temple, Viratra temple, Verthan temple and Shiva temple. In ancient time Chohtan is known as Pandva's Tapo Bhoomi because they resided there.

In the rainy season, natural ponds emerge and water falls can be visited by tourists. From Chohtan there are regular bus service between all major cities like Jaipur, Jodhpur, Jaisalmer, Ajmer, Ahmedabad, Mumbai and Surat.
 Chohtan has very rich sacred grooves called ORANS it's a place where deforestation is prohibited. This Oran is spread around Viratra temple and is considered one of the biggest ORANSs it has an area of 20000 BEEGHA.

Demographics
According to the Indian Census 2011, the population of Chohtan tehsil is 2,03,797. The population of Chohtan village is 12, 465 where male constitutes 6,603 and female constitutes 5,862.

Schools in Chohtan

 Government Senior Secondary School, Chohtan
 Kheemraj Doshi Bal Mandir School
 Adarsh Vidya Mandir Senior Secondary School, Baba Lunkaran Thanvi Marg Chohtan
 Government Girls Senior Secondary School, Chohtan
 Mother Teresa Brilliant Academy, Chohtan
 Viratra Public School, Chohtan
 GPS
 Kumbharam Arya Shikshan Sansthan Chohtan
 Swami Vivekanand Government Modal School(English Medium) Chohtan
 Marwar Public School, Chohtan
 Sharda Bal Niketan Madhaymik Vidhalay, Chohtan
 Bahadur Memorial Academy School Paradiya Chohtan
 TPS, Chohtan
 Naveen Academy, Chohtan
SANKAR BAAL SCHOOL CHOHTAN
 balika aadrash vidya mandir school chohtan

Colleges in Chohtan
 Viratra Mahavidhayalaya Verthan Road Chohtan
 Maa Vankal Malani Mahavidhyalaya Chohtan
 Daksh Mahavidhayalaya Ramsar Road Chohtan
 Government College, Bakhasar Road, Chohtan

References

External links
 Chohtan Coordinates

Villages in Barmer district
Tehsils of Barmer district